Deerfield may refer to:

Places

United States 
Deerfield, Illinois
Deerfield Township, Illinois (disambiguation)
Deerfield, Indiana
Deerfield, Iowa
Deerfield Township, Chickasaw County, Iowa
Deerfield, Kansas
Deerfield, Lexington, Kentucky
Deerfield, Maryland (disambiguation), multiple places
Deerfield, Massachusetts, a New England town
Deerfield (CDP), Massachusetts, a village in the town
Deerfield, Michigan
Deerfield, Minnesota
Deerfield Township, Minnesota (disambiguation), multiple places
Deerfield Township, Michigan (disambiguation), multiple places
Deerfield, Missouri
Deerfield, New Hampshire
Deerfield, New Jersey
Deerfield Township, New Jersey
Deerfield, New York
Deerfield, Ohio (disambiguation)
Deerfield Township, Ohio (disambiguation), multiple places
Deerfield Township, Pennsylvania (disambiguation), multiple places
Deerfield, South Dakota
Deerfield, Virginia
Deerfield, Wisconsin (disambiguation), multiple places

Elsewhere
Deerfield, Nova Scotia, Canada

Other uses
Deerfield Academy, a school in Deerfield, Massachusetts
Deerfield Residence, the residence in Dublin of the Ambassador of the United States to Ireland
Deerfield River, in northwestern Massachusetts
"Deerfield", the codename for an Itanium 2 processor
Ruger Deerfield Carbine, a .44 Magnum semi-automatic rifle

See also
Deerfield Beach, Florida
Deerfield High School (disambiguation)
Deerfield School (disambiguation)
Deerfield Township (disambiguation)
South Deerfield, Massachusetts
Upper Deerfield Township, New Jersey
West Deerfield Township, Lake County, Illinois